Steven Jacobs (born 6 June 1987) is a Belgian footballer who played for clubs including FCV Dender EH.

References

External links
 

1987 births
Living people
Belgian footballers
F.C.V. Dender E.H. players
Association football midfielders